Andrei Șaguna National College may refer to one of two educational institutions in Romania:

Andrei Șaguna National College (Brașov)
Andrei Șaguna National College (Sibiu)